Waynesville is a village in Wayne Township, Warren County, Ohio, United States. The population was 2,834 at the 2010 census. It is named for General "Mad" Anthony Wayne. The village, located at the crossroads of U.S. Route 42 and State Route 73, is known for its antique stores and its annual sauerkraut festival.

Waynesville is served by the Mary L. Cook Public Library. In 2005, the library loaned more than 203,000 items to its 8,000 cardholders. Total holdings in 2005 were over 67,000 volumes with over 110 periodical subscriptions.
In addition the community is served by WYNS, a low-powered community radio station which also streams on the internet.

Geography

Little Miami River is the only river that flows through Waynesville.

History 
Waynesville was laid out in 1796. It was named in honor of General “Mad” Anthony Wayne. Waynesville was originally built up chiefly by Quakers. A post office has been in operation at Waynesville since 1804.

Demographics

2010 census
As of the census of 2010, there were 2,834 people, 1,128 households, and 761 families living in the village. The racial makeup of the village was 96.8% White, 0.4% African American, 0.1% Native American, 0.4% Asian, 0.1% Pacific Islander, 0.1% from other races, and 2.1% from two or more races. Hispanic or Latino of any race were 1.2% of the population.

There were 1,128 households, of which 32.4% had children under the age of 18 living with them, 50.7% were married couples living together, 11.8% had a female householder with no husband present, 5.0% had a male householder with no wife present, and 32.5% were non-families. 29.0% of all households were made up of individuals, and 16.7% had someone living alone who was 65 years of age or older. The average household size was 2.42 and the average family size was 2.98.

The median age in the village was 41.6 years. 23.9% of residents were under the age of 18; 8.3% were between the ages of 18 and 24; 23.3% were from 25 to 44; 26.6% were from 45 to 64; and 17.9% were 65 years of age or older. The gender makeup of the village was 46.9% male and 53.1% female.

2000 census
As of the census of 2000, there were 2,558 people, 1,005 households, and 721 families living in the village. The population density was 1,124.8 people per square mile (435.1/km2). There were 1,037 housing units at an average density of 456.0 per square mile (176.4/km2). The racial makeup of the village was 98.32% White, 0.08% African American, 0.23% Native American, 0.08% Asian, 0.16% from other races, and 1.13% from two or more races. Hispanic or Latino of any race were 0.74% of the population.

There were 1,005 households, out of which 36.8% had children under the age of 18 living with them, 59.6% were married couples living together, 9.4% had a female householder with no husband present, and 28.2% were non-families. 24.8% of all households were made up of individuals, and 12.5% had someone living alone who was 65 years of age or older. The average household size was 2.54 and the average family size was 3.04.

In the village, the population was spread out, with 27.4% under the age of 18, 6.5% from 18 to 24, 31.4% from 25 to 44, 22.0% from 45 to 64, and 12.6% who were 65 years of age or older. The median age was 36 years. For every 100 females there were 89.5 males. For every 100 females age 18 and over, there were 82.5 males.

The median income for a household in the village was $50,202, and the median income for a family was $56,538. Males had a median income of $41,932 versus $31,207 for females. The per capita income for the village was $24,539. About 1.9% of families and 3.9% of the population were below the poverty line, including 3.3% of those under age 18 and 5.5% of those age 65 or over.

Notable people
Seth W. Brown, Congressman from 1897 to 1901.
William R. Hoel, officer in the United States Navy during the Civil War
Harvey A. Surface, zoologist and state congressman
John Evans (governor), founder of Northwestern University and the University of Denver, Governor of Colorado and co-architect of the Sand Creek Massacre

References

External links
 Village website
 Mary L. Cook Public Library
 Museum at the Friends Home
 Waynesville Area Chamber of Commerce

Villages in Warren County, Ohio
Villages in Ohio
Populated places established in 1797